Rajendra Tiku, is an Indian sculptor and art teacher known for his outdoor stone sculptures. He was honoured by the Government of India, in 2013, by bestowing on him the Padma Shri, the fourth highest civilian award, for his contributions to the field of art.

Biography

Rajendra Tiku was born in Wadwan, a remote village in the mountainous landscape of Jammu and Kashmir, the northernmost state of India, in 1953, in a Kashmiri Pandit family. He did his primary schooling at a local school and passed his matriculation from a high school in Srinagar. His graduate studies were at the Sri Pratap College, Srinagar, where he founded the Sri Pratap College Artists' Association and Tiku, simultaneously, studied clay modelling and stone carving, by attending the evening classes of a five-year course conducted by the Institute of Music and Fine Arts in the city, which he completed in 1978. The course offered Tiku exposure to the art of ancient cultures and modern masters. After completing BSc, Tiku graduated in law from the Srinagar University, but continued attending the various art camps organized by the Jammu and Kashmir Academy of Art, Culture and Languages.

Rajendra Tiku started his career as a teacher at the Burn Hall School, Srinagar, but moved, shortly afterwards, to the Institute of Music and Fine Arts, his alma mater, as an artist cum teacher. He lives in Jammu and Kashmir.

Career highlights and exhibitions
Rajendra Tiku has received both the junior (1993–95) and senior (1997–98) fellowships of the Ministry of Human Resource Development, the Government of India. He is also a recipient of a grant from the Pollock-Krasner Foundation, New York for commissioning sculptures at various parts in India, one of which can be found on the lawns of the Danwantri Library of the University of Jammu. Tiku has been invited to many sculpture workshops in places like USA, Switzerland, Israel, Russia, Egypt, Russia and  Thailand.

Rajendra Tiku has had solo and group exhibitions of his creations at various places around the world. Some of his notable exhibitions are:
 Metaphors in Matter (2008) held at Gallery Espace, New Delhi
 Bronze (2006) organized by Lalit Kala Akademi, held at Gallery Espace, New Delhi
 Sculpted Images (2003) India Habitat Centre, New Delhi
 Solo Exhibitions (1990, 1992, 1995, 1998 and 2003) held at Art Heritage, New Delhi
 Solo Exhibition (1998) organized by ABC Foundation, Varanasi
 National Exhibition of Art (India) organized by the  All India Fine Arts and Crafts Society
 International Exhibition of Graphic Prints
 Bharat bienniale of Contemporary Indian Art
 7th Triennale India
 8th Triennale India

Tiku has also published many articles in local magazines and journals. he has also been credited with using Śāradā script, a dying script of the Kashmiri language.

Awards and recognitions
In 2013, the Government of India honoured Rajendra Tikku with the fourth highest civilian award, Padma Shri. Besides, Rajendra Tiku has been honoured by different organizations many times.

 Eminent Artist National Award - 1993 - Lalit Kala Akademi
 Jammu and Kashmir State Award - 1978 - Government of Jammu and Kashmir
 Jammu and Kashmir State Award - 1979 - Government of Jammu and Kashmir
 Triennale Award - 8th Triennale - 1994

Sculptures
Some of the notable sculptures of Rajendra Tiku are:
 Hearth Back Home
 My House in the Snow
 Snow Drops
 Sprout
 Blue Rosary

References

External links
 
 
 
 

1953 births
Living people
Recipients of the Padma Shri in arts
People from Jammu and Kashmir
Indian male sculptors
20th-century Indian sculptors
20th-century Indian male artists